National Bank of the Republic of Uzbekistan for Foreign Economic Activity' Joint Stock Company (Uzbek National Bank or NBU RUz) (uzbek - O‘zbekiston Respublikasi Tashqi iqtisodiy faoliyat milliy banki), same as the National Bank of Uzbekistan (NBU) is universal commercial bank of Uzbekistan. It is the largest bank of Uzbekistan in the volume of assets combining the functions of project financing, universal commercial, investment and savings banks.

The principal business of the bank focuses on the policy of the Government of the Republic of Uzbekistan within international economic relations, promotion in development and strengthening of economic cooperation with other countries, expansion of the Republican's export potential, improvement of exports and imports of goods and services, operation of foreign economic activity, collection of foreign exchange funds, protection of foreign exchange interests

The bank promotes and actively supports economic reforms ongoing in the Republic of Uzbekistan due to its large-scale infrastructure.

History
It was established  under the decree of the President of the Republic of Uzbekistan I. Karimov on September 7, 1991. The bank started its operations on October 7, 1991. The staff amounted to one hundred positions. The first office of the National Bank was located at 23, Akhunbabayeva street.

In 1992, the bank made approximately 95% of the country's international payments, which enabled development of correspondent banking with leading global banks. Towards the end of the year, this network already involved 83 foreign banks. The Government appointed Chairman of the Board R. Azimov as the EBRD Governor for Uzbekistan. Uzbekistan is the fourth CIS country to receive approval of the EBRD strategy. The EBRD opens its first credit line of $60 million to support small and medium enterprises.

In 1993, cooperation with foreign banks was actively developing. The bank established correspondent relations with 120 banks in 35 countries, including with banks in the CIS countries: Russia, Ukraine, and Kazakhstan. NBU joins the international financial telecommunications system SWIFT, REUTERS, DOW JONES TELERATE , BLOOMBERG. The foundation of a new NBU tower was settled and the construction began.

In 1994, the bank opened more than 100 specialized exchange offices in Tashkent and in regional centers of the Republic of Uzbekistan purchasing and selling foreign currency, traveller's checks and currencies of the CIS countries for national currency. The bank took upon itself to serve as the country's agent to attract and service foreign loans and investments.

In 1995, the bank stood forth as the main founder when establishing the Association of Banks of Uzbekistan. In 1996, the number of employees reached 2,000 positions. The client base, which previously represented export-oriented industries, began to expand with small and private enterprises. In 1997, the number of employees increased up to 3,4 thous. positions.

In 1998, the bank joined the Association of Asian Banks (ABA). The National Bank was the first bank in Uzbekistan and Central Asia to switch to a new chart of accounts meeting international accounting standards. An increase in the bank's own capital up to US$571 million provided its position among the 500 largest banks in the world and additional base for banking operations. The correspondent banking network increased to 432 banks, including 30 banks in Uzbekistan and 402 - foreign banks in 66 countries all over the world. The end of the year was marked by a change in management. R.S. Azimov was appointed the Minister of Finances. According to the Decree of the President of the Republic of Uzbekistan, Zaynutdin Mirkhodjayev was appointed his successor. Previously, he worked as Deputy Minister of Foreign Economic Relations of the Republic of Uzbekistan.

The year 1999 became a foundation for expanding cooperation between the Association of Banks of Asia and ADFIAP. The parties agreed on joint arrangement of large forums and conferences in Uzbekistan to disclose investment potential of the country's economy to the Asian financial community, as well as establish partnership within specific projects and training programs. In terms of capital adequacy the bank is among the 50 largest banks in the world.

In 2000, being a member of the Association of Banks of Asia (ABA) and the Association of Development Financing Institutions in Asia and the Pacific (ADFIAP), the NBU held a meeting of the board of directors of ADFIAP. In the same year, the bank founded its professional football club "NBU-Asia."

In 2001, about 120 delegations from foreign financial institutions visited the bank. The correspondent network has expanded to 500 banks, including 472 foreign ones in 66 countries and 28 banks in Uzbekistan. The bank's website was launched.

The National Bank was the first financial institution in the CIS region to build a geographically distributed cluster data center on the IBM eServer p690 UNIX platform using SAN technology.

'Science and technology', Moscow - Tashkent, 2004.

In 2003, the bank adopted corporate bond underwriting. The bank’s debut was evaluated by the Uzbek Stock Exchange and awarded the title of 'Best Underwriting Company'. In 2004, the bank held a public international tender on banking software and selected GLOBUS Automated Banking Software as the best option, which has been integrated this year to the bank system. The same year was marked by a new product - American Express cheques for home storage. Since 2005, the bank joined the Interbank Association of the Shanghai Cooperation Organization and started cooperation with all members of the SCO Interbank Association participating in all events held.

In 2006, the bank rendered more than 70 kinds of retail services and made money transfers through the Western Union system. In April, the NBU and its subsidiary bank, Asia-Invest, adopted own express money transfer system 'Asia Express'. In 2009, Expert RA - Credit Rating Agency assigned the National Bank a high level of credit rating ('A' rating). In 2010, the correspondent network was expanded to 657 banks, including 30 banks in Uzbekistan and 627 foreign banks in 75 countries.

In 2012, the property of 66 enterprises in default was signed off to the bank. The investments in enterprises in default amounted to 116.2 billion . In 2013, the credit portfolio of the National Bank amounted to UZS 5.2 trillion. The number of attending customers amounted to more than 3 million.

As of January 1, 2014, the credit portfolio of the National Bank amounted to UZS 6.8 trillion . The property of 68 enterprises in default was signed off to the bank. The investments in enterprises in default amounted to UZS 208 billion. The corresponding banking network amounted to 670 international banks .

In December 2018, joint efforts of Visa International and Uzbekistan Airways provided the issue of co-branded NAK-NBU Visa Gold and Visa Platinum cards. [1]

In July 2019, the National Bank issued the first Visa Infinite premium card in Uzbekistan with exclusive privileges and opportunities. [2]

With the aim of adopting modern generally accepted principles of corporate Bank's management, according to the Decree of the President of the Republic of Uzbekistan dated November 30, 2019, No. PP-4540 on Measures to Transform the Unitary Enterprise 'National Bank of the Republic of Uzbekistan for Foreign Economic Activity' into Joint Stock Company, the NBU was transformed to 'National Bank of the Republic of Uzbekistan for Foreign Economic Activity' Joint Stock Company (NBU JSC).

According to this Decree of the President, the founder of the NBU JSC is the State represented by the Ministry of Finance and the Fund for Reconstruction and Development of the Republic of Uzbekistan. Besides, NBU JSC is the successor of rights, obligations and agreements, including international ones, of the transformed Uzbek National Bank.

Owners and management 
The Founder of the bank and the main holder of the Authorize Fund until November 30, 2019, was the Cabinet of Ministers of the Republic of Uzbekistan. The Cabinet of Ministers owned at least 60% of the bank’s Authorized Fund; RUB 2 billion and US$200 million were allocated from the state budget for these purposes .

According to the Decree of the President No. 4540, since November 30, 2019, the founder of the NBU JSC is the State represented by the Ministry of Finance and the Fund for Reconstruction and Development of the Republic of Uzbekistan.

List of managers

Operations

As for January 1, 2005 credit portfolio volume totaled 2, 418.4 billion soums (if compared with January 1, 2004 — 2,312.3 billion soums).

By 2014 the bank serviced more than 70% of Uzbekistan's foreign trade turnover, using credit lines offered by the European Bank for Reconstruction and Development, Asian Development Bank and the International Finance Corporation, the bank finances investment projects involving the construction, modernization and technical re-equipment of industries as well as purchase of raw materials.

The National Bank of Uzbekistan is a universal commercial bank rendering a full range of banking services, including investment business, project and foreign trade financing, asset management, cash management services for private and corporate clients, mortgage and consumer lending.

The bank has an extensive branch network.In 2018, the bank's assets amounted to 56,524.57 billion soums, own capital - 5,722.02 billion soums, net profit - 506.56 billion soums

Foreign economic activity 
Foreign economic activity of Uzbek National Bank is aimed at deepening the economic and commercial relations of the Republic of Uzbekistan with foreign countries, attracting investments and advanced technologies to the country's economy through cooperation with foreign banks and international financial institutions (IFIs).

The cooperation permanently provides further strengthening of positions of Uzbek National Bank in the global financial market by expanding cooperation with foreign banks within commercial and project financing, attraction of credit lines, international settlements, and treasury operations in the monetary and foreign exchange markets.

Uzbek National Bank has approximately 700 correspondent banks in 81 countries all over the world. The largest partner banks with opened correspondent accounts are such globally famous banks as: JP Morgan Chase, Citibank, The Bank of New York Mellon, Commerzbank, Deutsche Bank, Societe Generale, Credit Suisse, SMBC, MUFG Bank, Sberbank of Russia, etc.

The partners among foreign banks and IFIs are the China Development Bank, the Export-Import Bank of China, the Export-Import Bank of Korea, USA Exim Bank, Gazprombank, VEB.RF, Sberbank of Russia, Credit Suisse, AKA Bank, Raiffeisen Bank, ODDO BHF, NATIXIS, Credit Agricole, Commerzbank, Deutsche Bank, Landesbank Baden-Wuerttemberg, the European Bank of Reconstruction & Development, etc.

On August 26, 2019, in Beijing, the National Bank of the Republic of Uzbekistan for Foreign Economic Activity signed a loan agreement with the China Development Bank (CDB) to attract a credit line in CNY amounted to 500 million under the 5th meeting of Uzbek-Chinese Intergovernmental Cooperation Committee. The CNY loan agreement is the first such document signed with a leading Chinese financial institution in the history of NBU cooperation.

On December 14, 2019, 'National Bank of Uzbekistan' JSC signed an agreement to attract funds in national currency to finance small and medium-sized business projects amounted to UZS 953 billion (US$100 million) with Frontera Capital (Great Britain). This is the first transaction of a financial institution to raise funds in national currency.

Plastic cards 
In 1994, the National Bank joined Visa International and was the first bank in the country to provide Visa Classic plastic cards in the Uzbek market.

On April 10, 1996, the NBU launched the issue and servicing of cards in national currency. In 1997, it adopted the first project in Uzbekistan to issue wages using cards .

In 1998, the bank adopted a multi-issue banking transfer system using DUET microprocessor plastic cards and established own settlement and emission center in every regional center. In the same year, Visa Electron plastic cards were issued.

In May 2001, the NBU initiated the operation of interbank system of settlements using UZS plastic cards involving the NBU, Pakhtabank and Asaka Bank.

In 2002, the bank finished development and expansion of the service network for plastic cardholders and the transition from a single-issue to a multi-issue system for plastic cards. This resulted in a network of settlement and issue centers for issuing and servicing cards throughout the Republic, and a large infrastructure of ATM and terminal equipment.

Since May 2003, international VISA cards begin to be additionally serviced by NBU ATMs.

In 2004, due to the Resolution of the Cabinet of Ministers of the Republic of Uzbekistan on Measures to Further Develop Plastic Cards-based Settlement System, the share of plastic cards issued by the NBU reaches 60% of the total number of plastic cards in Uzbekistan.

Since 2007, the NBU has been offering credit overdraft cards issued as part of salary projects .

In 2008, the bank expanded its network of commercial and service enterprises approving plastic cards for payment from 2,653 to 3,553 units, and as of October 1, 2009 - up to 4,760 .

Since 2009, information kiosks approve payments with UZS plastic cards .

2010 was marked by a pilot project to provide information on UZS plastic cards via sms, e-mail and web.

In 2011, the bank began to issue online plastic cards via EMV standard UzCard interbank payment system.

In 2013, there were changes in the operation of exchange offices . On February 1, the sale of cash foreign currency was abolished . The bank adopted the sale of foreign currency to individuals in non-cash form using international payment cards .

Since 2016, the National Bank has been a principal member of MasterCard International payment system.

September 2017 was marked by an e-commerce project via Visa International cards. The new Internet acquiring (e-commerce) service in Uzbekistan enabled Visa cards acquiring on the global Internet, ensuring an increase in cashless payments and reduction of costs for enterprises, in particular, small and medium-sized businesses.

In November 2017, the bank launched Milliy mobile application enabling remote money transfers from one card to another, payment for various domestic and foreign services, opening of deposits, repayment of loans, etc.[3]

Since February 2017, transaction security when paying for goods and services on the Internet using Visa cards of the National Bank became supported by 3D Secure (Verified by Visa) minimizing the risks of card fraud.

In May 2018, the NBU became a principal member of the Union Pay International payment system.

In December 2018, joint efforts of Visa International and Uzbekistan Airways provided the issue of co-branded NAK-NBU Visa Gold and Visa Platinum cards. Their holders were able to receive bonus miles when paying for goods and services in commercial and service enterprises and the Internet. According to the UzAirPlus NAC loyalty program, accumulated miles can be exchanged for upgrading a service class, air ticket, etc. [4]

In February 2019, the NBU began to issue Visa International cards for corporate customers, i.e. Visa Business.

In March 2019, the bank launched e-commerce project using MasterCard International payment system providing approval of payment via MasterCard for goods and services provided online.

In April 2019, the bank began issuing contactless cards via VISA International (PayWave Visa) payment system.

In May 2019, the bank launched contactless acquiring via VISA International (PayWave Visa) payment system. Since May, there is an issue of HUMO contactless cards within National Payment System.

In July 2019, the National Bank supported by Visa International issued the first Visa Infinite premium card in Uzbekistan with exclusive privileges and opportunities. [5]

The number of issued cards as of January 1, 2019, was 2.03 million.

Number of ATMs as of January 1, 2019, is 24,113 units.

Money transfers 
Since 2002, the bank has been rendering services of money transfers for individuals based on an agreement on cooperation within money transfers via Western Union system signed with NPO Western Union DP Vostok. In 2006, the subsidiary bank of the National Bank of the Republic of Uzbekistan for Foreign Economic Activity in the Russian Federation - Joint-Stock Commercial Asia-Invest Bank has developed its own money transfer system called Asia Express to transfer money of individuals. The main direction of transfers is the Russian Federation - the Republic of Uzbekistan .

In March 2007, the bank entered into an agreement on accelerated non-trading transfers via MIGOM system with the European Trust Bank.

In April 2009, the National Bank's units servicing organizations started Quick Mail operations. Since March 2012, the bank's institutions launched MoneyGram transfer system operations.

In April 2012, the bank signed an agreement with Russlavbank CJSC to connect to Contact money transfer system and have operations to send and pay money transfers via this system in USD and EURO.

In 2013, the bank became a member of KoronaPay service .                         

In 2013, there were changes in the operation of exchange offices . On February 1, the sale of cash foreign currency was abolished . The bank adopted the sale of foreign currency to individuals in non-cash form using international payment cards .

September 2017 was marked by an e-commerce project via Visa International cards. The new Internet acquiring (e-commerce) service in Uzbekistan enabled Visa cards acquiring on the global Internet, ensuring an increase in cashless payments and reduction of costs for enterprises, in particular, small and medium-sized businesses.

Investment activity 
The NBU is the largest investment bank in the country. The bank's large-scale infrastructure enables development of the financial and industrial sectors that actively support economic reforms in Uzbekistan.

The bank's capital incorporation in strategically important enterprises of the Republic enables its participation in investment in enterprises of various sectors of the economy, their modernization, technological and technical re-equipment.

Businesses

Support for high-tech and socially significant sectors of the national economy, financing of modernization of existing and implementation of new productions, support for small businesses, creation and development of consumer goods productions based on processing of local raw materials.

The main borrowers of the bank are large domestic manufacturers, small and private businesses.

Most of the investments are allocated to develop oil production and refining, mechanical engineering, food industry, non-ferrous and ferrous metallurgy, textile industry, agricultural production, communications infrastructure, transport and tourism.

Financing of national-scale facilities

Loans from the National Bank are involved in almost all sectors of the economy of Uzbekistan. The great share in the structural transformations of the economy covers the development of communication systems - rail, road and aviation. The loans are also allocated to the development of priority sectors of the economy, financing of modernization of existing and implementation of new high-level productions, support for small businesses, creation and development of import-substituting consumer goods industries based on the processing of local raw materials.

Bank is systemically important for the Reporting and provides loans to the largest enterprises of the Republic of Uzbekistan under government guarantees. This determines low diversification of the loan portfolio, low return on assets, as well as a strong dependence on the financial policy of the Republic of Uzbekistan.

Irina Veliyeva - RA Expert, 2009

The bank provided financing for the development of many strategically important business facilities:

        construction of the Bukhara Oil Refinery.
        construction of Tashguzar - Boysun - Kumkurgan railway line.
        reconstruction of the Fergana Oil Refinery.
        modernization of Navoi TPP.
        reconstruction and modernization of the airport in Navoi city.
        upgrade and unification of the aircraft fleet of 'Uzbekistan Airways' NAC.
        supply of mining equipment for the Navoi Mining and Metallurgical Combine.
        construction of 'Akhangaran - Pungan gas pipeline.
        purchase of CASE agricultural machinery for Uzagromashservis Association and Uzprommashimpeks State Joint Stock Foreign Trade Company.
        construction of a propane-butane mixture plant to increase the production of liquefied gas at the Mubarak Gas Processing Plant.
        purchase of Daimler-Chrysler buses for the Tashgorpasstrans Association.
        purchase of passenger electric locomotives for Temir Yollari State Joint Stock Railway Company.
        upgrade and equipage of the existing fleet of drilling installations of Uzbekneftegaz NHC.
        construction of gas dehydration at the Kungrad compressor station.

As well as number of other investment projects implemented .

Indicators 
In 2008, the share of the NBU in the total assets of Uzbek banks amounted to more than 40%. In the same year, the bank served about 20% of the country's enterprises, including almost 40% of joint ventures

In 2018, the bank's assets amounted to UZS 56,524.57 billion, own capital - UZS 5,722.02 billion, net profit - UZS 506.56 billion (See details in the electronic annual report for 2018).

In 2019, the bank's assets amounted to UZS 66,604.99 billion, own capital - UZS 13,141.07 billion, net profit - UZS 1,043.65 billion.

Ratings 
The NBU is a credit and financial institution of the country rated by such international agencies as Moody’s Investors Service and Standard & Poor’s. The receiving and confirmation of high marks from leading international rating agencies remains relevant and important for the NBU.

December 24, 2018 was marked by an increase in long-term credit rating by Standard & Poor’s international rating agency from 'B+' to 'BB-'. 

 since 1993, according to the ratings of The Banker magazine, the National Bank is in the first thousand of the largest banking institutions all over the world with 862nd place .
 1998 - the Euromoney magazine recognized the National Bank of the Republic of Uzbekistan as the best bank in Uzbekistan, and in 2002, according to the same magazine,          the NBU was recognized as the “Bank of the Year" .
 2000 - Thomson Bank wath (TBW) confirmed a credit rating of LC-1 and a country rating of IC-B / C .
 2001 - 'The Best Bank of Uzbekistan' from The Banker.
 2002 - 'The Best Bank of Uzbekistan' from Euromoney and Global Finance .
 2004 - The Best Bank of Uzbekistan' from Global Finance.
 2012 - the bank recognized as the best bank of the year in attracting deposits in a contest held by the Central Bank of the Republic of Uzbekistan and the Association of             Banks of Uzbekistan . According to the study of the CIS banking sector by the RIA Rating Agency, the bank was ranked 50th in the 'list of the largest CIS banks' .
 2013 - the bank recognized as the best bank of the year in attracting deposits and the most innovative bank in a contest held by the Central Bank of the Republic of Uzbekistan and the Association of Banks of Uzbekistan . According to RIA Rating Agency, the bank was ranked 55th in the 'list of the CIS largest banks' .

Subsidiaries

Asia-Invest Bank 
JSC "Asia-Invest Bank" was established in 1996, in accordance with the intergovernmental Agreement between Russia and Uzbekistan "On the basic principles and directions of economic cooperation for 1996-1997" in Russia (Moscow), in order to further develop cooperation in the financial and banking sector, the first Uzbek-Russian Joint Bank.

NBU Invest group 
On March 31, 2008, a subsidiary company, Open Joint-Stock Company NBU Invest Group, was established with a charter capital of $25 million. The main purpose of the creation of the NBU Invest Group is to establish a company capable of restructuring and managing the assets of Uzbekistan’s enterprises, as well as attracting foreign investment to develop the real sector of the country's economy.

The main business is asset management. Operational management of industrial enterprises is aimed at improving production efficiency and includes business planning, marketing, monitoring the activities of the enterprise, managing sales channels and supplier relations, personnel management, cost and performance analysis. Participation in investment projects of the NBU.

References 

 Official site
 National Bank for Foreign Economic Activity of the Republic of Uzbekistan

Banks of Uzbekistan
Banks established in 1991
1991 establishments in Uzbekistan